Collins "Mike" Hagler (born March 15, 1935) was a Canadian football player who played for the Saskatchewan Roughriders and Ottawa Rough Riders. He won the Grey Cup with Ottawa in 1960. He played college football for the University of Iowa.

References

1935 births
Players of American football from Washington, D.C.
Iowa Hawkeyes football players
Saskatchewan Roughriders players
Ottawa Rough Riders players
Living people